Paraconexibacter algicola is a species of Actinomycetota.

References

Actinomycetota